The fly genus Dipsa is a junior synonym of Lonchoptera.
Dipsa is a tiny, mucus-like, extremely venomous snake from Medieval bestiaries. They were so venomous that their victim would die before becoming aware he had been bitten.

References 

Medieval European legendary creatures
Legendary serpents